Molding (American English) or moulding (British and Commonwealth English; see spelling differences) is the process of manufacturing by shaping liquid or pliable raw material using a rigid frame called a mold or matrix. This itself may have been made using a pattern or model of the final object.

A mold or mould is a hollowed-out block that is filled with a liquid or pliable material such as plastic, glass, metal, or ceramic raw material. The liquid hardens or sets inside the mold, adopting its shape. A mold is a counterpart to a cast. The very common bi-valve molding process uses two molds, one for each half of the object.

Articulated molds have multiple pieces that come together to form the complete mold, and then disassemble to release the finished casting; they are expensive, but necessary when the casting shape has complex overhangs.

Piece-molding uses a number of different molds, each creating a section of a complicated object. This is generally only used for larger and more valuable objects.

Blow molding is a manufacturing process for forming and joining hollow plastic or glass parts.

A manufacturer who makes molds is called a moldmaker. A release agent is typically used to make removal of the hardened/set substance from the mold more easily effected. Typical uses for molded plastics include molded furniture, molded household goods, molded cases, and structural materials.

Types 
There are several types of molding methods.

These includes:

Casting, the oldest term, covering a wide range of materials, especially metals
Blow molding
Powder metallurgy plus sintering
Compression molding
Extrusion molding
Injection molding
Laminating
 Reaction injection molding
Matrix molding
Rotational molding (or Rotomolding)
Spin casting
Transfer molding
Thermoforming
 Vacuum forming, a simplified version of thermoforming
FRP moulding
 Hand lay up moulding
 Resin transfer moulding
 Vacuum bag moulding
 Bladder moulding
 Spray up molding
 Reaction injection molding

Gallery

See also 

Blow molding
Forming
Injection molding machine
Pressing
Stone mould

Procedure 

 
 

zh:模塑